The Denton Armory is a historic armory located at Denton, Caroline County, Maryland.

Description
It is a two-story brick structure with a full basement, completed in 1938.  Its basic structure was designed in the PWA Moderne style, with numerous historicist Gothic Revival architectural elements.

It is important for its association with the reorganization and expansion of the U.S. National Guard system in the 20th century.

It currently houses the General James F. Fretterd Community Center of Caroline County, used for county-sponsored services including the county Recreation and Parks Department staff headquarters, and is also available by reservation for community events.

Landmark
The Denton Armory was listed on the National Register of Historic Places in 1985.

References

External links
, including photo from 1980, at Maryland Historical Trust

Government buildings in Maryland
Buildings and structures in Caroline County, Maryland
Denton, Maryland
Community centers in Maryland
Government buildings completed in 1938
Armories on the National Register of Historic Places in Maryland
Government buildings on the National Register of Historic Places in Maryland
National Register of Historic Places in Caroline County, Maryland
Brick buildings and structures